Mireille Dittmann (born 10 January 1974) is a former professional tennis player from Australia.

Biography
A right-handed player from Victoria, Dittmann had a career-high singles ranking of 197.

She qualified for the main draw of two WTA Tour tournaments in 2001, at Bali and Shanghai. In 2002, she featured in the Shanghai main draw again and lost her first-round match to Anna Kournikova, in front of a large centre court crowd who had come to see the high profile Russian.

In the 2002 season, she competed in the qualifying draws of all four Grand Slam tournaments.

ITF Circuit finals

Singles: 10 (2–8)

Doubles: 11 (5–6)

References

External links
 
 

1974 births
Living people
Australian female tennis players
Tennis people from Victoria (Australia)
21st-century Australian women